The following is a list of Microsoft Windows components.

Configuration and maintenance

User interface

Applications and utilities

Windows Server components

File systems

Core components

Services 

This list is not all-inclusive.

DirectX 
 Direct3D
 DirectDraw
 DirectInput
 DirectMusic
 DirectPlay
 DirectShow
 DirectSound
 DirectX Media Objects
 DirectX plugin
 DirectX Video Acceleration

Networking 
 Administrative share
 Distributed File System
 My Network Places (formerly Network Neighborhood)
 Network Access Protection
 Remote Installation Services
 Server Message Block
 Windows Rights Management Services

Scripting and command-line
 Batch file
 CHKDSK
 Cmd.exe
 ComSpec
 Ipconfig
 Net / Net Send
 Netdom.exe: Windows Domain Manager
 Netsh
 Netstat
 QBasic
 Regsvr32
 Robocopy
 Win32 console
 Windows Script Host
 Windows PowerShell
 XCOPY

Kernel 
 Commit charge
 Kernel Transaction Manager
 Win32 Thread Information Block

.NET Framework 
 Assembly
 CLI Languages
 Metadata
 .NET Remoting
 ADO.NET
 ASP.NET
 Base Class Library
 Common Intermediate Language
 Common Language Infrastructure
 Common Language Runtime
 Common Type System
 Virtual Execution System
 Windows CardSpace
 Windows Communication Foundation
 Windows Forms
 Windows Presentation Foundation
 Windows Workflow Foundation

Security

Deprecated components and apps

APIs
 ClearType
 Media Foundation
 Windows Driver Foundation
 Windows Imaging Component
 Windows Management Instrumentation

Miscellaneous (to be categorized)
 ActiveSync
 Compatibility Appraiser collects telemetry information.
 DMRC (Device Metadata Retrieval Client) interfaces to metadata about devices from Windows 7 onwards.
 I/O technologies
 Macro Recorder
 Microsoft Agent
 Prefetcher
 ReadyBoost
 Sync Center
 Text Services Framework
 Universal Audio Architecture
 Windows Color System
 Windows Diagnostic Infrastructure (WDI)
 Windows Mobile Device Center
 Windows Rally
 Windows Registry
 Windows Speech Recognition
 XML Paper Specification

See also
 Outline of Microsoft
 List of Unix daemons
 List of games included with Windows

References

Windows
 
